The 1939 Limerick Senior Hurling Championship was the 45th staging of the Limerick Senior Hurling Championship since its establishment by the Limerick County Board.

Ahane were the defending champions.

Ahane won the championship after a 5-08 to 2-04 defeat of Croom in the final. It was their eighth championship title overall and their seventh title in succession.

Results

Final

References

Limerick Senior Hurling Championship
Limerick Senior Hurling Championship